The Central European Tour Szerencs-Ibrány is a road cycling race held in Hungary. It is part of UCI Europe Tour in category 1.2.

Winners

References

UCI Europe Tour races
Recurring sporting events established in 2014
2014 establishments in Hungary
Cycle races in Hungary
Summer events in Hungary